The 2008 Insight Bowl was a college football bowl game played at Sun Devil Stadium in Tempe, Arizona. The game, in its 20th year of existence, was played on December 31, 2008. The game, which was telecast on NFL Network, featured the Kansas Jayhawks of the Big 12 Conference against the Minnesota Golden Gophers from the Big Ten Conference, with the Jayhawks winning, 42–21. The victory gave the Jayhawks their 3rd consecutive win in a Bowl Game and 6th Bowl Game victory overall. This is also, as of 2022, the Jayhawks last bowl victory.

Scoring summary

References

Insight Bowl
Guaranteed Rate Bowl
Kansas Jayhawks football bowl games
Minnesota Golden Gophers football bowl games
Sports in Tempe, Arizona
Insight Bowl
December 2008 sports events in the United States
Sports competitions in Maricopa County, Arizona